The 25th European Men's Artistic Gymnastics Championships were held in Patras, Greece from 18 to 21 April 2002. This event was for male gymnasts in senior and junior levels.

Medalists

Medal table

Combined

Seniors

Juniors

Senior results
Full results of the men's senior competition.

Team

All-around

Floor

Pommel horse

Rings

Vault

Parallel bars

Horizontal bars

Junior results
Full results of the men's junior competition.

Team

All-around

Floor

Pommel horse

Rings

Vault

Parallel bars

Horizontal bar

References

European Artistic Gymnastics Championships
2002 in gymnastics
2002 in European sport
International gymnastics competitions hosted by Greece